Spasskoye is a rural locality (a selo) in Simskoye Rural Settlement, Yuryev-Polsky District, Vladimir Oblast, Russia. The population was 300 as of 2010. There are 3 streets.

Geography 
Spasskoye is located 34 km northwest of Yuryev-Polsky (the district's administrative centre) by road. Dobrynskoye is the nearest rural locality.

References 

Rural localities in Yuryev-Polsky District